Vlastimir Kusik (Osijek, 1953. – Osijek, 2018.), was a Croatian art historian, art critic and long-term curator of Gallery of Fine Arts, Osijek.

Biography 
Kusik was born in Osijek, Croatia, he studied art history and archaeology in University of Zagreb and graduated 1976. 

Between 1977 and 1981, he worked in Regional conservation institute for Slavonia in Osijek. 

After that he worked as a curator of the Gallery of Fine Arts, Osijek. In his professional career, the self-denying Kusik has written more than five hundred scientific papers professional essays and organized about a hundred exhibitions. He particularly focused on artists related to Osijek and Slavonia, such as Julije Knifer, Đuro Seder, 
Oscar Nemon and many others. 

In the 1980s, he became politically active as a member of the Pannella Italian Radical Party and was one of the founders Radical Association for the United States of Europe in Zagreb.

Vlastimir is merit for Pannella sojourn in Osijek to celebrate the New Year on 31 December 1991, despite constant artillery attacks from Serbian forces.

References

External links 

 Vlastimir Kusik 

1953 births
2018 deaths
Croatian art historians
Croatian art critics